The white-throated earthcreeper (Upucerthia albigula) is a species of bird in the family Furnariidae. It is found in Chile and Peru. Its natural habitat is subtropical or tropical high-altitude shrubland.

References

white-throated earthcreeper
Birds of Chile
Birds of the Peruvian Andes
white-throated earthcreeper
Taxonomy articles created by Polbot